Welspun Corp Limited is the second largest manufacturer of large diameter pipes in the world based in Mumbai, Maharashtra. It is a flagship company of the $3 billion (129 billion) Welspun Group. It operates a 1.65 mtpa plant in Anjar, Gujarat, which is being increased to 2.1 mtpa.

Divisions
 The Welspun Pipes Division manufactures pipes from Dahej (Gujarat), Anjar (Gujarat) and Mandya (Karnataka) in India and Little Rock, Arkansas in the U.S.
 Welspun Plates and Coil manufactures plates up to 4.5 meters wide and coils up to 2.8 meters wide.
 Welspun Tubular LLC (USA): This spiral pipe and coating facility is spread across 740 acres and has an annual capacity of 350,000 tons near Little Rock Port, Arkansas. Welspun Tubular LLC begins production at its new electric-resistance welded (ERW) steel pipe mill in Little Rock, Ark., in 2012 according to a company executive.
 Welspun Natural Resources Ltd is a joint venture with Adani Group. It has a portfolio of eight oil and gas assets across India, Thailand and Egypt.
 Welspun Energy Ltd was incorporated to set up thermal power plants and solar energy power generating facilities.
 Welspun Infratech Ltd was recently acquired from MSK Projects India Ltd to enter the infrastructure sector.

History
It was incorporated in 1995 as Welspun Gujarat Stahl Rohren Ltd. It was renamed from Welspun Gujarat Stahl Rohren Ltd to Welspun Corp Ltd.

Awards & Recognitions

References

External links
Stocks of SEBI-indicted companies hammered :Welspun Corp Ltd
Welspun Corp, Ackruti City tank on being barred for stock rigging by SEBI
Welspun Corp Ltd

Manufacturing companies based in Mumbai
Steel companies of India
Welspun Group
Construction and civil engineering companies of India
Indian companies established in 1995
Construction and civil engineering companies established in 1995
1995 establishments in Maharashtra
Companies listed on the National Stock Exchange of India
Companies listed on the Bombay Stock Exchange